Hansip was a type of local security officers of an administrative village in Indonesia.
Based on Presidential Decree No. 55/ 1972, Hansip is part of defense and security component in Total Defense and Security System. 
Hansip was disbanded in 2014 by Presidential Regulation No. 88/ 2014. One reason for such retraction is related to government regulation No. 6/ 2010. Task and function of hansip is already currently replaced by and conducted by the municipal police, locally known as Satpol PP.

In Bali
Hansip work in coordination with other groups - the police and pecalang (in the case of Bali), the latter being redirected for extra policing of large events from more mundane tasks like traffic direction.

References

Law enforcement in Indonesia